Francis Crump (1711-1800s) was a London silversmith producing mostly hollowware. He was apprenticed to Gabriel Sleath (1674–1756), who objected to Huguenot goldsmiths working in England, and on 23 November 1753 entered into a partnership with him.

A marriage licence was issued on "19 May 1741 to Francis Crump of St. Foster's, City of London, silversmith, bachelor, 30, and Hester Dolling of the parish aforesaid, spinster, 21 ; at Compton."

References

English silversmiths
1711 births
19th-century deaths